Columbella mercatoria is a species of sea snail, a marine gastropod mollusk in the family Columbellidae, the dove snails.

Description
The length of the shell attains 14.6 mm.

Distribution

References

 Risso, A., 1826 Histoire naturelle des principales productions de l'Europe Méridionale et particulièrement de celles des environs de Nice et des Alpes-Maritimes. Mollusques, vol. 4, p. 1-439, 12 pls
 Rosenberg, G. 1992. Encyclopedia of Seashells. Dorset: New York. 224 pp.

External links
 Linnaeus, C. (1758). Systema Naturae per regna tria naturae, secundum classes, ordines, genera, species, cum characteribus, differentiis, synonymis, locis. Editio decima, reformata [10th revised edition, vol. 1: 824 pp. Laurentius Salvius: Holmiae]
 Sowerby, G. B., I. (1844). Monograph of the genus Columbella. In G. B. Sowerby II (ed.), Thesaurus conchyliorum, or monographs of genera of shells. Vol. 1 (4): 109-146bis, pls 36-40. London, privately published
 Dall W.H. & Bartsch P. (1911). New species of shells from Bermuda. Proceedings of the United States National Museum. 40: 277-288, pl. 35
 Russini V., Fassio G., Modica M. V., deMaintenon M. J. & Oliverio M. (2017). An assessment of the genus Columbella Lamarck, 1799 (Gastropoda: Columbellidae) from eastern Atlantic. Zoosystema. 39(2): 197-212
 Rosenberg, G.; Moretzsohn, F.; García, E. F. (2009). Gastropoda (Mollusca) of the Gulf of Mexico, Pp. 579–699 in: Felder, D.L. and D.K. Camp (eds.), Gulf of Mexico–Origins, Waters, and Biota. Texas A&M Press, College Station, Texas.

Columbellidae
Gastropods described in 1758
Taxa named by Carl Linnaeus